The Monegros Desert or Desierto de los Monegros is a semidesert in Aragón, northeastern Spain, spanning the provinces of Zaragoza and Huesca. It  is a semi arid zone prone to frequent droughts. It is noted for its annual electronic music festival held in mid-July, the Monegros Festival.

Geography

The Monegros Desert spans the provinces of Zaragoza and Huesca in the region of Aragón, including the comarca of Monegros in Huesca. Part of the desert lies in the Ebro Valley. Deserted farms and farm houses and juniperous woods are also seen in scattered locations.

Flora and fauna
The environment requires plants that can endure salinity and dryness. Though the natural habitat of the region included shrub-steppe and juniper, cereal grasses have become replacements.

Lesser kestrel frequent the area; they nest in caves spread across  of the Monegros Desert. 

The area is protected as part of the Natura 2000 network. Two LIFE projects co‑financed by the European Commission have targeted the Monegros area, at least partially.

The Monegros Desert contains the proposed Los Monegros Protected Area, an area of biological interest due to its high number of endemic species and new discoveries. There are over 5,400 species in the area, according to a 1999 survey. However, the Government of Aragon has not decided to take measures to protect the area. Further research was performed in 2000, this time on the steppe elements of the Monegros biota.

Conservation

Conservation of the biodiversity in the steppe ecosystem of the Monegros of the Aragon region envisages habitat improvements for steppe birds and related plant life. Improvements in irrigation are planned. However the setting up of a casino may adversely affect conservation efforts.

The Aragon Steppes are cited as the largest habitat for bird communities in Spain. Highly endangered are great and little bustards, Eurasian stone-curlew, lesser kestrel, Montagu's harrier and Dupont's lark, as these species are directly threatened by changes in the steppe ecosystem. The endemic plant species, 45% of all plant species in Spain, are also under decline. A project supported by BirdLife International at the "Muelas del Jiloca" Special Protection Area has been launched to conserve the birds and plants.

Economy
The area is sparsely populated. A large scale economic development called Gran Scala was projected in the region, with some 32 planned casinos, 70 hotels, 232 restaurants, 500 stores, a golf course, a race track and a bullring planned, despite the region suffering from water and oil issues. The main roads of access are the N-II and AP-2, and it is also connected by rail.

Culture

Monegros Desert Festival
The Monegros Desert is noted for its Monegros Desert Festival, usually held in mid-July, attracting numerous Spaniards and internationally renowned DJs and bands and some 40,000 people to its electronic music performances annually.

References

Deserts of Spain
Deserts of Europe
Geography of the Province of Huesca
Geography of the Province of Zaragoza
Festivals in Spain
Recurring events established in 1992
1992 establishments in Spain